John Marvel (September 11, 1926 – March 16, 2013) was an American rancher and politician.

Born in Battle Mountain, Nevada, Marvel served in the United States Army during World War II. Marvel was a cattle rancher. He graduated from University of Nevada, Reno. Marvel served in the Nevada Assembly 1978-2008 as a Republican. He died in Carson City, Nevada.

Notes

1926 births
2013 deaths
People from Lander County, Nevada
University of Nevada, Reno alumni
Ranchers from Nevada
Republican Party members of the Nevada Assembly